Capriata d'Orba is a comune (municipality) in the Province of Alessandria in the Italian region Piedmont, located about  southeast of Turin and about  south of Alessandria.

Capriata d'Orba borders the following municipalities: Basaluzzo, Castelletto d'Orba, Francavilla Bisio, Predosa, Rocca Grimalda, San Cristoforo, and Silvano d'Orba.

References

Cities and towns in Piedmont